The 1974–75 Cleveland Crusaders season was the Cleveland Crusaders third season of operation in the World Hockey Association. It was the Crusaders' first season in the new Coliseum at Richfield. The Crusaders made the playoffs, losing in the quarter-finals to the Houston Aeros.

Offseason

Regular season

Final standings

Game log

Playoffs

Houston Aeros 4, Cleveland Crusaders 1 - Quarterfinals

Player stats

Note: Pos = Position; GP = Games played; G = Goals; A = Assists; Pts = Points; +/- = plus/minus; PIM = Penalty minutes; PPG = Power-play goals; SHG = Short-handed goals; GWG = Game-winning goals
      MIN = Minutes played; W = Wins; L = Losses; T = Ties; GA = Goals-against; GAA = Goals-against average; SO = Shutouts;

Awards and records

Transactions

Draft picks
Cleveland's draft picks at the 1974 WHA Amateur Draft.

Farm teams

See also
1974–75 WHA season

References

External links

Cleveland Crusaders seasons
Cleve
Cleve